Bhutanese cuisine (Dzongkha: འབྲུག་ཟས་; Wylie: brug-zas) employs much red rice (like brown rice in texture, but with a nutty taste, the only variety of rice that grows at high altitudes), buckwheat, and increasingly maize.

Regional cuisines
Buckwheat is eaten mainly in Bumthang, maize in the Eastern districts, and rice elsewhere. The diet in the hills also includes chicken, yak meat, dried beef, pork, pork fat, and lamb. Soups and stews of meat, rice, ferns, lentils, and dried vegetables, spiced with chili peppers and cheese, are a favorite meal during the cold seasons. Zow shungo is a rice dish mixed with leftover vegetables. Ema datshi is a spicy dish made with large, green chili peppers in a cheesy sauce (similar to chile con queso), which might be called the national dish for its ubiquity and the pride that Bhutanese have for it. Other foods include jasha maru (a chicken dish), phaksha paa (dried pork cooked with chili peppers, spices, and vegetables, including turnips, greens, or radishes), thukpa, puta (buckwheat noodles), bathup, and fried rice.

Snacks
Popular snacks include momo (Bhutanese dumplings), shakam eezay, khabzey (dried fritters made with flour, water, and sugar, which are then deep-fried), shabalay, juma (Bhutanese sausages marinated in spices), and noodles.

Foreign influences
Restaurants in the country can serve Chinese, Nepalese, Tibetan and Indian foods, which are very popular and in recent years Korean restaurants have opened due to the increasing popularity of Korean popular culture in the country.

Dairy and beverages
Dairy foods, particularly butter and cheese from yaks and cows, are also popular, and indeed almost all milk is turned into butter and cheese. Cheese made from cow's milk called datshi is never eaten raw, but used to make sauces. Zoedoe is another type of cheese made in the Eastern districts, which is added to soups. Zoedoe is normally greenish in color and has a strong smell. Other types of cheese include Western types like Cheddar and Gouda. Western cheese is made in the Swiss Cheese Factory in Bumthang or imported from India. Popular beverages include butter tea prepared using tea leaves, salt and butter (called suja), milk tea (called ngaja), black tea, locally brewed ara (rice wine), and beer. Spices include curry, cardamom, ginger, thingay (Sichuan pepper), garlic, turmeric, and caraway.

Etiquette
When offered food, one says meshu meshu, covering one's mouth with the hands in refusal according to Bhutanese manners, and then gives in on the second or third offer.

See also

 Ara (drink)
 Bhutanese red rice
 Dal
 Ema datshi (ཨེ་མ་དར་ཚིལ།) (also spelled "Ema datse")
 Tsheringma tea
 Yak butter

References

 Rennie, Frank; Mason, Robin (2008.) Bhutan: ways of knowing. Information Age Publishing, Inc. 
 Tashi Delek Drukair Magazine Volume XII No. 4 Fall 2007 Page 42

External links
 'Datsi in the Druk Highlands,' Article in Sunday Mid-Day,01-02-2009, by Arjun Razdan

 
South Asian cuisine